Martin Jílek (born 7 July 1986) is a former Czech football player. He played mainly for the FC Zbrojovka Brno.

References
Profile at iDNES.cz
Guardian Football

1986 births
Living people
People from Hustopeče
Czech footballers
Czech First League players
FC Zbrojovka Brno players
Association football defenders
Sportspeople from the South Moravian Region